Beyond the Astral Skies is the third and final album by Electric Sun. It was released in 1985 on EMI.

Track listing
 All songs composed by Uli Jon Roth
 "The Night the Master Comes" - 4:16
 "What Is Love?" - 3:24
 "Why?" - 4:51
 "I'll Be There" - 5:02
 "Return (Chant of Angels)" - 3:27
 "Icebreaker" - 2:39
 "I'm a River" - 4:45
 "Angel of Peace" - 3:43
 "Eleison" - 6:56
 "Son of Sky" - 2:21

Personnel
Michael Flexig (as Michael Flechsig) - lead vocals on 2, 6, 9, 10, harmony vocals on 1-4, 6-10  
Uli Jon Roth - lead and backing vocals, guitars, keyboards, bass
Nicky Moore - harmony vocals on 1 
Ule Ritgen - bass guitar, harmony vocals on 2, 4
Clive Bunker - drums, timpani
Elizabeth Mackenzie - soprano and alto on 9
Robert Curtis - violin and viola on 9
Jenni Evans - harmony vocals on 1, 5, 6, 8
Dorothy Patterson - harmony vocals on 5, 6
Zeno Roth - harmony vocals on 1, 3, 6, 8
Rainer Przywara - harmony vocals on 2, 3, 4, 7, 9, 10

Production
Produced by Uli Jon Roth

Influence
The composer-guitarist Andy DiGelsomina of Lyraka has mentioned the album as containing both his favorite guitar solos and tones.

References

1985 albums
Electric Sun albums